A by-election was held for the New South Wales Legislative Assembly electorate of Hastings and Macleay on 1 March 1900 because Edmund Barton resigned to travel to London with Alfred Deakin and Charles Kingston to explain the federation bill to the British Government. Francis Clarke was the former member who had resigned in 1898 to allow Barton to re-enter parliament.

Dates

Result

Edmund Barton resigned to travel to London with Alfred Deakin and Charles Kingston to explain the federation bill to the British Government.

See also
Electoral results for the district of Hastings and Macleay
List of New South Wales state by-elections

References

1900 elections in Australia
New South Wales state by-elections
1900s in New South Wales